Studio B are a British electronic music trio consisting of Harry Brooks, Simon Hulbert and Lewis Coleman. The original version of their debut single, "I See Girls (Crazy)" featuring Romeo, made number 52 on the UK Singles Chart in December 2003. The track was then re-released in 2005 using a Tom Neville remix of the song, reaching number 12. The music video shows a man being chased by a group of girls reminiscent of a skit from the movie Monty Python's The Meaning of Life. In 2010, a thirty-second clip of the song was used in a commercial for Tide detergent with Acti-Lift.

The follow-up single "C'mon Get It On" was released in April 2006, featuring British singer Kelly Beckett who was later member of the girl group Paradiso Girls. Since 2006, Studio B have also worked with British singer Lisa Maffia on an album which was to be released April 2009, including writing the track "Bad Girl (At Night)", which reached number 4 on the UK Dance Chart.

Discography

Singles

References

External links
Studio B at Discogs

English dance music groups
English electronic music groups
British musical trios
Musical groups from London